Lieutenant-Colonel Charles Lawrence Tyndall "Taffy" Walwyn  (1883–1959) was a British Army officer of the First World War who received the Military Cross. His son was the race horse trainer Peter Walwyn.

Walwyn was commissioned into the Carmarthen Artilley Militia in June 1901, and transferred to the regular army as a second lieutenant in the Royal Artillery on 24 December 1902.

References

External links

Royal Artillery officers
Recipients of the Military Cross
Companions of the Distinguished Service Order
1883 births
1959 deaths
Officers of the Order of the British Empire
Charles
British Army personnel of World War I